Xəlilli (also, Khalilli and Xillili) is a village and municipality in the Jalilabad Rayon of Azerbaijan.

References 

Populated places in Jalilabad District (Azerbaijan)